Evgeni Alexandrovich Fadeev (born 9 July 1982) is a Kazakhstani former ice hockey defenceman. He played six seasons in the Kontinental Hockey League between 2008 and 2014 with Barys Astana. Internationally he played for the Kazakhstan national team at seven World Championships.

Career statistics

References

External links

1982 births
Avtomobilist Yekaterinburg players
Barys Nur-Sultan players
Gornyak Rudny players
Kazakhstani ice hockey defencemen
Kazakhmys Satpaev players
Kazzinc-Torpedo players
Living people
Nomad Astana players
Saryarka Karagandy players
Sportspeople from Oskemen
Asian Games gold medalists for Kazakhstan
Medalists at the 2011 Asian Winter Games
Asian Games medalists in ice hockey
Ice hockey players at the 2011 Asian Winter Games